was an oil tanker that sank in the Pacific Ocean in 1977 with the loss of her cargo and one crewmember.

She was built in 1965 by Mitsui Bussan as Borgila for Fred. Olsen & Co. In 1973, she was sold to Marine Transport Lines and renamed Oswego Patriot, and in 1975 Indo-Pacific Carriers purchased her and gave her the name Hawaiian Patriot. At the time of her loss, she was registered in Liberia.

The following day, she suffered a huge explosion and the crew abandoned the ship, which burned for several hours before sinking. 38 of the 39 crewmembers were rescued by a cargo ship, Philippine Bataan, which had reached the scene. The sinking left an estimated 50,000 tonnes of oil in the water, but no cleanup response took place as currents moved the slick west and it did not make landfall. The lost cargo was valued at $12 million by insurer Fireman's Fund Insurance Company.

References

Maritime incidents in 1977
Oil tankers
1965 ships